Statistics of the Scottish Football League in season 1906–07.

Scottish League Division One

Scottish League Division Two

See also
1906–07 in Scottish football

References

 
1906-07